The Robert and Mabel Loomis House is a historic residence located in Hood River, Oregon, United States.

The house was listed on the National Register of Historic Places in 1990.

See also

National Register of Historic Places listings in Hood River County, Oregon

References

External links

1938 establishments in Oregon
Buildings and structures in Hood River, Oregon
Houses completed in 1938
Houses in Hood River County, Oregon
Houses on the National Register of Historic Places in Oregon
Mediterranean Revival architecture in Oregon
National Register of Historic Places in Hood River County, Oregon